Sumay may refer to:
 Sumay, Guam, a former village on Guam
 Sumay River, in Guam
 Sumay-ye Beradust District, Iran
 Sumay-ye Jonubi Rural District, Iran
 Sumay-ye Shomali Rural District, Iran